Wennappuwa is a town in Puttalam District, North Western Province, Sri Lanka.

The village of Wennappuwa is mentioned in the Culavamsa as a small farming hamlet.

History 
A church made of wattle and daub, consecrated to St. Joseph, was put up in Gangoda in 1850. Very Rev. Fr. Contentious Chounavel (OMI) a French Missionary and the founder of the church arrived at Wennappuwa between 1861 and 1863 A.D. 300 families lived there at the time. His intention was to gather those families whose faith was strong and visible, under one roof. The roads were coming up and he realized that a new church should be built by the main road in order to accommodate the growth.

The brother of Utuwankande Sura Saradiel of Mawanella lived with his family at Haldanduwana and learnt sculpture under Rev. Fr. Chounavel, the Parish Priest of Haldanduwana and a master of sculpture. The historical statue of St. Joseph on the front facade of the St. Joseph's Church Wennappuwa was sculpted by him.

The church (1880 AD), which is a symbol of unity and co-existence, stands by the Negombo-Chilaw main road.

Education 
Wennapuwa is home to the Joseph Vaz College and the Holy Family Girls' School. and a few schools.

Economy 
Wennappuwa town has more than 500 businesses. The Wennappuwa Business association is the largest business association there. It represents almost all businesses. Recently they developed the nearby lake. Wennappuwa became known as Little Italy because of the number of people who migrated to Italy and earn Euros. All the state banks and many private banks operate there.

References

 The historical facts on Wennappuwa and the church were extracted from the magazine 'Siyawas Jubilee Samaruwa' published at the centenary celebrations in 1981. 

Towns in Puttalam District